Club Deportivo Aoiz is a Spanish football team based in Aoiz - Agoitz in the autonomous community of Navarre. Founded in 1929, it plays in 3ª - Group 15. Its stadium is Estadio San Miguel with a capacity of 2000 seats.

Season to season

17 seasons in Tercera División

External links
Futbolme.com profile  
CD Aoiz on Futnavarra.es  
CD Aoiz on Elfutbolnavarro.es  

Football clubs in Navarre
Association football clubs established in 1929
1929 establishments in Spain